The Silver Logie for Most Outstanding Reality Program is an award presented annually at the Australian TV Week Logie Awards. The award is given to recognise an outstanding Australian reality television program. The winner and nominees of this award are chosen by television industry juries. It was first awarded at the 61st Annual TV Week Logie Awards ceremony, held in 2019.

Winner and Nominees
Listed below are the winners, as well as their nominees, for each year.

See also
 Logie Award for Most Popular Reality Program

References

External links

2019 establishments in Australia